Curtis Wayne Whitley (May 10, 1969 – May 11, 2008) was an American football center in the National Football League. He  played six seasons for the San Diego Chargers (1992–1994), the Carolina Panthers (1995–1996), and the Oakland Raiders (1997). Born in Smithfield, North Carolina, he graduated from Smithfield-Selma High School before attending Clemson University. He was then selected by the Chargers in the fifth round of the 1992 NFL Draft. He was selected by the Carolina Panthers in the 1995 NFL Expansion Draft.

He was found dead from a drug overdose in Texas on May 11, 2008, one day after his 39th birthday.

References
Curtis Whitley's career stats

External links

1969 births
2008 deaths
American football centers
Carolina Panthers players
Chowan Hawks football players
Clemson Tigers football players
Drug-related deaths in Texas
Oakland Raiders players
People from Smithfield, North Carolina
Players of American football from North Carolina
San Diego Chargers players